Junghuhnia is a genus of crust fungi in the family Steccherinaceae (formerly placed in the family Meruliaceae). It was circumscribed by Czech mycologist August Carl Joseph Corda in 1842. The generic name honours German-Dutch botanist Franz Wilhelm Junghuhn.

Description
The fruit bodies of Junghuhnia species are crust-like (rarely with a cap). They have a dimitic hyphal system and encrusted cystidia. Their spores are obovoid (egg-shaped) to cylindrical.

Species
, Index Fungorum accepts 36 species in Junghuhnia:
Junghuhnia africana  Ipulet & Ryvarden (2005) – Uganda
Junghuhnia aurantilaeta  (Corner) Spirin (2007)
Junghuhnia autumnale  Spirin, Zmitr. & Malysheva (2007)
Junghuhnia carneola  (Bres.) Rajchenb. (1984) – St. Lucia
Junghuhnia chlamydospora  Ryvarden (2007) – Belize
Junghuhnia collabens  (Fr.) Ryvarden (1972)
Junghuhnia complicata  Blumenf. & J.E.Wright (1984)
Junghuhnia conchiformis   X.L.Zeng & Ryvarden (1992)
Junghuhnia crustacea  (Jungh.) Ryvarden (1972) – Africa
Junghuhnia fimbriatella  (Peck) Ryvarden (1972)
Junghuhnia flabellata  H.S.Yuan & Y.C.Dai (2012) – China
Junghuhnia glabricystidia  Ipulet & Ryvarden (2005)
Junghuhnia globospora  Iturr. & Ryvarden (2010) – Brazil; Venezuela
Junghuhnia imbricata   Spirin (2007)
Junghuhnia japonica  Núñez & Ryvarden (1999) – Japan
Junghuhnia kotlabae   Pouzar (2003)
Junghuhnia luteoalba   (P.Karst.) Ryvarden (1972)
Junghuhnia meridionalis  (Rajchenb.) Rajchenb. (2003)
Junghuhnia micropora  Spirin, Zmitr. & Malysheva (2007)
Junghuhnia minor   H.S.Yuan (2011)
Junghuhnia minuta  I.Lindblad & Ryvarden (1999) – Costa Rica
Junghuhnia neotropica  I.Lindblad & Ryvarden (1999) – Costa Rica
Junghuhnia nitida  (Pers.) Ryvarden (1972) – Asia; Africa; Europe
Junghuhnia polycystidifera  (Rick) Rajchenb. (1987)
Junghuhnia pseudominuta  H.S.Yuan & Y.C.Dai (2008)
Junghuhnia pseudozilingiana  (Parmasto) Ryvarden (1972)
Junghuhnia rhizomorpha  H.S.Yuan & Y.C.Dai (2008) – China
Junghuhnia semisupiniformis  (Murrill) Ryvarden (1985) – Brazil; Mexico; Europe (Italy, France, Germany); Caribbean
Junghuhnia subfimbriata   (Romell) Ginns (1984)
Junghuhnia subnitida  H.S.Yuan & Y.C.Dai (2008) – China
Junghuhnia subundata  (Murrill) Ryvarden (2014)
Junghuhnia taiwaniana  H.S.Yuan, Sheng H.Wu & Y.C.Dai (2012) – Taiwan
Junghuhnia tropica  H.S.Yuan, Sheng H.Wu & Y.C.Dai (2012)
Junghuhnia undigera  (Berk. & M.A.Curtis) Ryvarden (1984)
Junghuhnia vitellina  Spirin (2005)
Junghuhnia zonata  (Bres.) Ryvarden (1972)

References

Steccherinaceae
Polyporales genera
Taxa described in 1842
Taxa named by August Carl Joseph Corda